Wakanda is a JavaScript platform to develop and run web or mobile apps.

It is based on open standards technologies including AngularJS, Ionic, Node.js, and TypeScript, and is supported on Linux (deployment only), Microsoft Windows, and macOS (Studio development).

Platform
Wakanda consists of a stack of tools and technologies:
Wakanda Server Combines an object-relational database with a JavaScript server engine. Provides a Database Abstraction Layer for DB and Web Services, an auto-generated REST API, and security layer management.
Wakanda Studio Is a desktop IDE with editors for designing the data model. It is shaped for Web and Mobile Apps. It provides building functionalities for mobile development (using Apache Cordova). 
Wakanda Client Connector Consists of a data provider to communicate with the server and front-end frameworks like AngularJS 1 & 2 and Ionic 1 & 2.

History
Starting in 2008 with the server, Wakanda was first presented at The Ajax Experience in 2009 and then the same year at JSConf.eu. A private Developer Preview was made accessible in 2010 with a first version of the Wakanda Studio including a Model Designer and a GUI Designer.
Wakanda came to public attention in June 2011 with a new Developer Preview, with a second public Developer Preview announced during the "Wakanday - JS.everywhere(Boston, October, 2011)" conference, and the first Beta on December, 15th. Wakanda is available as a Live Release version since March 15, 2012.

On June 28, 2012, the first version of Wakanda was officially launched. On October 26, 2012 it was demonstrated at the JS.everywhere() conference, in the US and France.

First involved in the CommonJS working group since 2009, the team created the "Client and Server JavaScript APIs" W3C Community Group in April 2012, before joining the W3C in October 2012.

The company Wakanda SAS was created in December 2014. On the December 7, 2015 the Wakanda Digital App Factory was officially launched.

In 2016, Wakanda was named Cool Vendor by Gartner.

Architecture
Wakanda Server supports CommonJS modules, Web Workers, Web Storage, XMLHttpRequest, HTML5 File API, Blobs, Timers. It implements the Firebug Crossfire Debugger protocol, as well as the WebKit remote debugging protocol.

The WakandaDB NoSQL engine is accessed via HTTP, inspired by the OData REST API, integrates connectors to interact with tiers databases: MySQL, Microsoft SQL Server and ODBC.

Wakanda supports some of the Node.js modules including EventEmitter, Socket, and TLS. Wakanda includes other open source projects as part of its default packages. Wakanda Server is built with JavaScriptCore, ICU, OpenSSL, and Zlib.

References

External links

HTML5
JavaScript
JavaScript libraries
Ajax (programming)
Free software programmed in JavaScript
Free database management systems
NoSQL
Software using the GNU AGPL license
JavaScript web frameworks